George Walker (c.1645 – 1 July 1690 Old Style) was an English soldier and Anglican priest. He was joint Governor of Londonderry  during the Siege in 1689. He was killed at the Battle of the Boyne while going to the aid of the wounded Duke of Schomberg.

Family 
George Walker II (1645–1690) was born in Wighill, now in North  Yorkshire, England, the son of George Walker (1600–1677), rector of Kilmore, County Armagh and Chancellor of Armagh, and Ursula Stanhope (1617–1654), daughter of Sir John Stanhope of Melwood. Walker was educated at Glasgow University. He married Isabella Barclay (1644–1705), by whom he had nine sons and daughters: George Walker III 1669–1699; James 1670–1700; John 1671–1726; Gervase 1672–1693; Robert 1674–1705; Thomas 1677–1712; Mary 1679; Charity 1681–1728; Elizabeth 1683.

Early career 
He became rector of the Parish of Donaghmore in 1674. He was also made rector of the Parishes of Lessan (or Lissan) and Desertlyn, in the Church of Ireland Diocese of Armagh.

Siege of Derry 

A Doctor of Divinity, Walker was joint Governor of Londonderry along with Robert Lundy during the Siege of Derry in 1689, and received the thanks of the House of Commons for his work.

He was killed at the Battle of the Boyne on 1 July 1690 (12 July New Style), whilst going to the aid of Frederick Schomberg, 1st Duke of Schomberg, Commander-in-Chief of all Williamite forces in Ireland, who was wounded during the crossing of the river in the early part of the battle. He was originally buried at the battlefield but at the insistence of his widow, his body was later exhumed and buried inside the church at Castlecaufield, County Tyrone.  His body was later rediscovered and re-interred next to that of his wife but not before a cast was taken of his skull.

The Walker Plinth on the Londonderry city walls which was completed in 1828, remains in his memory; although the column that stood on the plinth was destroyed in an IRA bomb attack in 1973.

References

External links

The Siege of Londonderry in 1689 by George Walker
National Portrait Gallery
George Walker Genealogy Page

Phrenological Notice of the Skull of Walker by the Ulster Archeological Society

1610s births
1690 deaths
Doctors of Divinity
English army officers
English military personnel killed in action
Alumni of the University of Glasgow
People from the Borough of Harrogate
History of Derry (city)
17th-century English Anglican priests
Year of birth uncertain
Williamite military personnel of the Williamite War in Ireland
Military personnel from Yorkshire